This is the discography of the British band Mike + The Mechanics. They have released nine studio albums, five compilation albums, more than thirty singles, and one concert video.

Albums

Studio albums

Compilation albums

Singles

Other appearances

Videos

References

External links

 Official Facebook page

Discography
Discographies of British artists
Pop music group discographies
Rock music group discographies